Konchiravila Devi Temple is a temple located at Konchiravila in Trivandrum district of Kerala, India.

External links
 Facebook

Devi temples in Kerala
Hindu temples in Thiruvananthapuram district